Guillaume de Saint-André (fl. 14th century) was the secretary and biographer of John IV of Brittany.

Bibliography
Histoire de Jean de Bretagne (in verse)

External links
 

French biographers
Writers from Brittany
Year of birth unknown
Year of death unknown
14th-century Breton people
14th-century writers
French male writers